The 2022 ADAC TCR Germany Touring Car Championship will be the seventh season of touring car racing to be run by the German-based sanctioning body ADAC to the TCR regulations.

Teams and drivers 
Hankook is the official tire supplier.

Calendar and results

References

External links 
 

ADAC TCR Germany
ADAC TCR Germany Touring Car Championship